Al Lewis may refer to:

Al Lewis (singer-songwriter) (born 1984), Welsh singer and songwriter
Al Lewis (lyricist) (1901–1967), American songwriter
Al Lewis (actor) (1923–2006), American character actor
Al Lewis (columnist), American journalist
Al Lewis (banjoist) (1902–1992), American jazz banjoist
Al Lewis, host of The Uncle Al Show
Al Lewis, radio broadcaster and program director at KVNU in Logan, Utah

See also
Alan Lewis (disambiguation) 
Albert Lewis (disambiguation)
Alfred Lewis (disambiguation)
Allan Lewis (disambiguation)
Allen Lewis (disambiguation)
Alun Lewis (disambiguation)
Alvin Lewis (disambiguation)